SS James B. Duke was a Liberty ship built in the United States during World War II. She was named after James B. Duke, founder of the American Tobacco Company, co-founder of Duke Energy, and establisher of The Duke Endowment.

Construction
James B. Duke was laid down on 29 April 1944, under a Maritime Commission (MARCOM) contract, MC hull 2362, by J.A. Jones Construction, Brunswick, Georgia; she was sponsored by Mrs.Doris Duke Cromwell, daughter of James Duke, and launched on 19 June 1944.

History
She was allocated to Wessel Duval & Company, on 30 June 1944. On 23 September 1949, she was laid up in the National Defense Reserve Fleet in Mobile, Alabama. On 30 March 1952, she was laid up in the National Defense Reserve Fleet in Beaumont, Texas. On 1 May 1972, she was sold to Luria Brothers & Company, for $40,333.33, for scrapping. She was removed from the fleet on 27 June 1972.

References

Bibliography

 
 
 
 
 

 

Liberty ships
Ships built in Brunswick, Georgia
1944 ships
Mobile Reserve Fleet
Beaumont Reserve Fleet